Marion Municipal Airport  is three miles northeast of Marion, in Marion County, Ohio. The FAA's National Plan of Integrated Airport Systems for 2011–2015 categorized it as a general aviation facility.

The airport saw commercial airline service by TWA, from 1950 through 1953 and by Lake Central Airlines from 1953 through 1961. The airport then saw service from small commuter airlines during the 1960s.

Facilities
It has two asphalt runways: 7/25 is 5,000 by 100 feet (1,524 x 30 m) and 13/31 is 3,498 by 100 feet (1,066 x 30 m).

In the year ending May 18, 2009 the airport had 42,650 aircraft operations, average 116 per day: 87% general aviation, 13% air taxi, and <1% military. 62 aircraft were then based at the airport: 60% single-engine, 5% multi-engine, 3% helicopter, 29% glider and 3% ultralight.

References

External links 
 Aerial photo as of 7 April 1994 from USGS The National Map
 

Airports in Ohio
Transportation in Marion County, Ohio
Buildings and structures in Marion, Ohio